Nanna Mølbach Johansen (born 19 November 1986) is a Danish retired football midfielder who played for IK Skovbakken and the Danish national team.

International career

Johansen was also part of the Danish team at the 2005 European Championships.

References 

1986 births
Living people
Danish women's footballers
Denmark women's international footballers
Women's association football forwards